37th Division or 37th Infantry Division may refer to:

Infantry divisions
 37th Division (German Empire)
 37th Mountain Infantry Division Modena (Kingdom of Italy)
 37th Division (Imperial Japanese Army)
 37th Rifle Division (Soviet Union) (see Divisions of the Soviet Union 1917-1945)
 37th Guards Rifle Division (Soviet Union)
 37th Division (United Kingdom)
 37th Infantry Division (United States)

Cavalry Divisions
 37th SS Volunteer Cavalry Division Lützow
 37th Cavalry Division (Soviet Union)

Armoured Divisions
37th Tank Division, Red Army, c.1941
37th Guards Tank Division, Soviet Ground Forces

Aviation divisions
 37th Air Division (United States)

See also
 37th Brigade (disambiguation)
 37th Regiment (disambiguation)
 37th Squadron (disambiguation)